Anke Mühlbauer (born 18 April 1968) is a German diver. She competed in the women's 3 metre springboard event at the 1988 Summer Olympics.

References

External links
 

1968 births
Living people
German female divers
Olympic divers of West Germany
Divers at the 1988 Summer Olympics
People from Wolfsburg
Sportspeople from Lower Saxony
20th-century German women